XIII is the 13th full-length album by the German heavy metal band Rage, and the second collaboration with the Lingua Mortis Orchestra. It was released in 1998.

Critical reception

In 2005, XIII was ranked number 272 in Rock Hard magazine's book of The 500 Greatest Rock & Metal Albums of All Time.

Track listing

Limited edition bonus tracks

Personnel

Band members
Peter "Peavy" Wagner – vocals, bass
Spiros Efthimiadis – guitars
Sven Fischer – guitars
Chris Efthimiadis – drums

Additional musicians 
 Christian Wolff – piano
 Lingua Mortis Orchestra

Production 
 Christian Wolff – producer
 Ronald Prent – mixing, mastering
 Sander Van Der Heide – mastering

References

Rage (German band) albums
1998 albums
GUN Records albums
Symphonic metal albums by German artists